Schaenicoscelis elegans is a species of spiders in the family Oxyopidae. It was first described in 1898 by Simon. It is found in Brazil.

References

External links 
 Schaenicoscelis elegans at the World Spider Catalog

Oxyopidae
Spiders described in 1898
Spiders of Brazil